Cypress is a village in Johnson County, Illinois, United States. The population was 234 at the 2010 census.

History

Cypress was established in the late 1890s as a stop along the Chicago and Eastern Illinois Railroad, a Class I railroad. In 1984, the railroad was abandoned. A post office which had been operating at Gray's Mill (east of modern Cypress) was moved to the new location, a former bank. The village's name is likely a reference to the cypress trees that grow in abundance in the Cache River basin. Cypress Grade School was built in 1917, before April 28, 2002, when a tornado hit the school. Around four years later, the current school was finished.

Transportation

No airports or bus systems are active in Cypress. Bicycling is common inside the village. Remains of train tracks from the Chicago and Eastern Illinois Railroad lay, but are currently abandoned and not in use.

Major highways

 Illinois Route 37

Geography
Cypress is located in southwestern Johnson County at  (37.365543, -89.017473).  The village is situated in the Cache River basin northwest of Karnak and southwest of Vienna. The Heron Pond – Little Black Slough Nature Preserve lies to the east of Cypress. Illinois Route 37 passes through the village.

Demographics

As of the census of 2000, there were 271 people, 117 households, and 80 families residing in the village. The racial makeup of the village was 99.26% White, and 0.74% from two or more races.

There were 117 households, out of which 23.1% had children under the age of 18 living with them, 55.6% were married couples living together, 6.0% had a female householder with no husband present, and 31.6% were non-families. 25.6% of all households were made up of individuals, and 14.5% had someone living alone who was 65 years of age or older.  The average household size was 2.32 and the average family size was 2.81.

In the village, the population was spread out, with 17.7% under the age of 18, 11.8% from 18 to 24, 31.4% from 25 to 44, 22.1% from 45 to 64, and 17.0% who were 65 years of age or older.  The median age was 40 years. For every 100 females, there were 103.8 males.  For every 100 females age 18 and over, there were 97.3 males.

The median income for a household in the village was $30,208, and the median income for a family was $37,813. Males had a median income of $22,750 versus $17,917 for females. The per capita income for the village was $13,849.  About 3.1% of families and 7.6% of the population were below the poverty line, including none of those under the age of eighteen or sixty five or over.

References

External links

Villages in Johnson County, Illinois
Villages in Illinois